The social hygiene movement was an attempt by Progressive era reformers to control venereal disease, regulate prostitution and vice, and disseminate sexual education through the use of scientific research methods and modern media techniques. Social hygiene as a profession grew alongside social work and other public health movements of the era. Social hygienists emphasized sexual continence and strict self-discipline as a solution to societal ills, tracing prostitution, drug use and illegitimacy to rapid urbanization. The movement remained alive throughout much of the 20th century and found its way into American schools, where it was transmitted in the form of classroom films about menstruation, sexually transmitted disease, drug abuse and acceptable sexual behavior in addition to an array of pamphlets, posters, textbooks and films.

History
The social hygiene movement of the late 19th and early 20th centuries was an attempt by Progressive-era reformers to control venereal disease, regulate prostitution and vice, and disseminate sexual education through the use of scientific research methods and modern media techniques. A mental hygiene movement also developed, partly separately and now generally known as mental health, although the older term is still in use, e.g. in New York state's law.
The social hygiene movement represented a rationalized, professionalized version of the earlier social purity movement. Many reformers, such as Marie Stopes, were also proponents of eugenics. Inspired by Charles Darwin's theory of natural selection, they argued for the sterilisation of certain groups, even racial groups, in society. Indeed, by the 1930s thousands of forced sterilizations of people deemed undesirable took place in America and other countries each year. This continued for several more decades in some countries, though after 1945, the movement was largely discredited.

Social Hygiene Movement
Social hygiene as a profession grew alongside social work and other public health movements of the era. Social hygienists emphasized sexual continence and strict self-discipline as a solution to societal ills, tracing prostitution, drug use and illegitimacy to rapid urbanization.

The social hygiene movement began to gain momentum and in 1913 making the movement part of publishings such as the American Journal of Public Health. The American Social Hygiene Association was officially formed in 1913. It was later renamed to the American Social Health Association and, in 2012, the American Sexual Health Association.

The Social hygiene approach was adopted in medical schools in Russia in the 1920s and supported by the Commissariat of Public Health. The definition adopted by Commissar Nikolai Semashko was less focussed on eugenics and more in line with what is now regarded as public health: “study of the influence of economic and social factors on the incidence of disease and on the ways to make the population healthy”. The State Institute for Social Hygiene opened in 1923.  This approach was not popular with educators or with medical students. In 1930 the institute was renamed the Institute of Organisation of Health Care and Hygiene.

The movement remained alive throughout much of the 20th century and found its way into American schools, where it was transmitted in the form of classroom films about menstruation, sexually transmitted disease, drug abuse and acceptable sexual behavior in addition to an array of pamphlets, posters, textbooks and films.

American Social Hygiene Association
The American Social Hygiene Association partnered with the government during World War I.  The American Social Hygiene Association provided social hygiene health and sexual health information to the soldiers in hopes that this education would help take fewer soldiers out of action from venereal diseases.

The idea of prostitution was considered a “necessary evil” in light of an artificial demand that had been created through various forms including political corruption and advertising. With further investigation into the business of prostitution cities that did not contain commercialized prostitution had less crime and appeared to be in better shape than those who contained such. Most prostitutes that had been examined were found to have venereal diseases, but with that included a negative social stigma which stopped people from getting examined and so there became a campaign involving several organizations to suppress prostitution and begin educating people about sex and venereal diseases. The two organizations that had developed were the American Vigilance Association, fighting prostitution, and the American Federation for Sex Hygiene. Finally, the two organizations had realized their mutual interest and called a meeting in Buffalo, New York which the term “social hygiene” was coined.  By 1914 the organizations formed into one, calling themselves, “The American Social Hygiene Association”.

Progressive Era
The social hygiene movement helped with the development of the management of prostitution in the Progressive Era. The Progressive Era was the turning point in the state's regulations of sexuality. It was said that the Progressive Era had physicians and women moral reformers working together to help manage prostitution and educate the people on social hygiene.

Racial Hygiene Association
This link between racial hygiene and social hygiene movements can be seen in Australia, where the Racial Hygiene Association of New South Wales is now named The Family Planning Association.

Negro Project
In the 1940s during World War II, ASHA (American Social Hygiene Association) launched a new project called The Negro Project, also known as the Negro Venereal Disease Education Project. The aim of this project was to address the widespread presence of venereal diseases among African Americans. In the early 1940s, ASHA drafted a grant proposal and in 1942 it was sent to prospective funding agencies. The proposal emphasized two main aspects of the Negro Project, “that the higher rate of prevalence of venereal diseases among the black population was alarming; and two, that this higher prevalence rate was not the fault of the black community.” (A. Sharma) The main purpose of the Negro Project was to provide educational materials and methods for instruction regarding syphilis. Some of the intended materials to be produced were pamphlets, posters, and motion pictures specifically aimed at the African American community. After being rejected by private funding organizations, the project found support from the Social Protection Division of the Federal Security Agency. In November 1943 in New York City, the Negro Project held its first major activity which was the National Conference on Wartime Problems in Venereal Disease Control. This conference was held so that they could form a committee and create an action plan for the Negro Project. After the national conference in 1943, project officials held meetings at regional level, predominantly in Southern states. However, in 1945 the records of the project suddenly go silent and no further activity for this project was documented in ASHA records. It has been speculated that due to the Social Protection Division of the Federal Security Agency being dissolved in the 1940s, the funds for the project dried up causing the project to end.

Mental Hygiene Movement
In regards to the mental hygiene movement, it helped providers realize that the problems of mental health and prevention of disease goes beyond providers in hospitals. The movement helped healthcare train their providers properly. It also helped with studies of more sympathetic treatment for mental health patients.

See also
 Commission on Training Camp Activities
 Comstock laws
 History of condoms
 La Follette-Bulwinkle Act
 Mann Act
 Mental health
 Racial hygiene
 Timeline of reproductive rights legislation
 United States obscenity law

References

External links
American Social Hygiene Posters - Online repository of social hygiene posters from the University of Minnesota
 
The Prelinger Archives at the Internet Archive

Progressive Era in the United States
Health movements
Hygiene
Compulsory sterilization
Social history of the United States